Derek Charles de Boorder (born 25 October 1985) is a New Zealand cricketer. He played in the 2004 U-19 Cricket World Cup in Bangladesh and he was awarded a player's contract for Auckland for the 2006-07 and for Otago for the 2007-08. He is the older brother of Andrew de Boorder. He plays his club cricket for the North East Valley club in Dunedin.

Born at Hastings and educated at Macleans College in Auckland, de Boorder took a New Zealand record eight catches in an innings playing for Otago against Wellington in 2009/10.

References

External links
 

1985 births
Living people
New Zealand cricketers
Auckland cricketers
Otago cricketers
New Zealand people of Dutch descent
North Island cricketers
Wicket-keepers